In electromagnetism, the electromagnetic tensor or electromagnetic field tensor (sometimes called the field strength tensor, Faraday tensor or Maxwell bivector) is a mathematical object that describes the electromagnetic field in spacetime.  The field tensor was first used after the four-dimensional tensor formulation of special relativity was introduced by Hermann Minkowski. The tensor allows related physical laws to be written very concisely, and allows for the quantization of the electromagnetic field by Lagrangian formulation described below.

Definition

The electromagnetic tensor, conventionally labelled F, is defined as the exterior derivative of the electromagnetic four-potential, A, a differential 1-form:

Therefore, F is a differential 2-form—that is, an antisymmetric rank-2 tensor field—on Minkowski space. In component form,

SI units for Maxwell's equations and the particle physicist's sign convention for the signature of Minkowski space , will be used throughout this article.

Relationship with the classical fields
The Faraday differential 2-form is given by

This is the exterior derivative of its 1-form antiderivative

,

where  has  ( is a scalar potential for the irrotational/conservative vector field ) and  has  ( is a vector potential for the solenoidal vector field ).

Note that

The electric and magnetic fields can be obtained from the components of the electromagnetic tensor. The relationship is simplest in Cartesian coordinates:

where c is the speed of light, and

where  is the Levi-Civita tensor. This gives the fields in a particular reference frame; if the reference frame is changed, the components of the electromagnetic tensor will transform covariantly, and the fields in the new frame will be given by the new components.
  
In contravariant matrix form with metric signature (+,-,-,-),

The covariant form is given by index lowering,

The Faraday tensor's Hodge dual is 

From now on in this article, when the electric or magnetic fields are mentioned, a Cartesian coordinate system is assumed, and the electric and magnetic fields are with respect to the coordinate system's reference frame, as in the equations above.

Properties

The matrix form of the field tensor yields the following properties:

Antisymmetry: 
Six independent components: In Cartesian coordinates, these are simply the three spatial components of the electric field (Ex, Ey, Ez) and magnetic field (Bx, By, Bz).
Inner product: If one forms an inner product of the field strength tensor a Lorentz invariant is formed  meaning this number does not change from one frame of reference to another.
Pseudoscalar invariant: The product of the tensor  with its Hodge dual  gives a Lorentz invariant:  where  is the rank-4 Levi-Civita symbol. The sign for the above depends on the convention used for the Levi-Civita symbol.
Determinant:  which is proportional to the square of the above invariant.
Trace:  which is equal to zero.

Significance

This tensor simplifies and reduces Maxwell's equations as four vector calculus equations into two tensor field equations. In electrostatics and electrodynamics, Gauss's law and Ampère's circuital law are respectively:

and reduce to the inhomogeneous Maxwell equation:

,    where     is the four-current.

In magnetostatics and magnetodynamics, Gauss's law for magnetism and Maxwell–Faraday equation are respectively:

which reduce to Bianchi identity:

or using the index notation with square brackets for the antisymmetric part of the tensor:

Relativity

The field tensor derives its name from the fact that the electromagnetic field is found to obey the tensor transformation law, this general property of  physical laws being recognised after the advent of special relativity. This theory stipulated that all the laws of physics should take the same form in all coordinate systems – this led to the introduction of tensors. The tensor formalism also leads to a mathematically simpler presentation of physical laws.

The inhomogeneous Maxwell equation leads to the continuity equation:

implying conservation of charge.

Maxwell's laws above can be generalised to curved spacetime by simply replacing partial derivatives with covariant derivatives:

 and  

where the semi-colon notation represents a covariant derivative, as opposed to a partial derivative. These equations are sometimes referred to as the curved space Maxwell equations. Again, the second equation implies charge conservation (in curved spacetime):

Lagrangian formulation of classical electromagnetism

Classical electromagnetism and Maxwell's equations can be derived from the action:

where  is over space and time.

This means the Lagrangian density is

The two middle terms in the parentheses are the same, as are the two outer terms, so the Lagrangian density is

Substituting this into the Euler–Lagrange equation of motion for a field:

So the Euler–Lagrange equation becomes:

The quantity in parentheses above is just the field tensor, so this finally simplifies to

That equation is another way of writing the two inhomogeneous Maxwell's equations (namely,  Gauss's law and Ampère's circuital law) using the substitutions:

where i, j, k take the values 1, 2, and 3.

Hamiltonian form

The Hamiltonian density can be obtained with the usual relation,

.

Quantum electrodynamics and field theory

The Lagrangian of quantum electrodynamics extends beyond the classical Lagrangian established in relativity to incorporate the creation and annihilation of photons (and electrons):

where the first part in the right hand side, containing the Dirac spinor , represents the Dirac field. In quantum field theory it is used as the template for the gauge field strength tensor. By being employed in addition to the local interaction Lagrangian it reprises its usual role in QED.

See also
 Classification of electromagnetic fields
 Covariant formulation of classical electromagnetism
 Electromagnetic stress–energy tensor
 Gluon field strength tensor
 Ricci calculus
 Riemann–Silberstein vector

Notes

References

Electromagnetism
Minkowski spacetime
Theory of relativity
Tensor physical quantities
Tensors in general relativity